Raorchestes kakachi (Kakachi shrub frog) is a species of frogs in the family Rhacophoridae. It is endemic to the southern Western Ghats of India. The specific name kakachi refers to the type locality from where the species was described.

Description
It is a small sized frog with males ranging from 24.7–25.8 mm (based on three specimens) and females from 24.3–34.1 mm (based on three specimens). It is distinguished from all other congeners from the following suite of characters. Oval snout under dorsal view; indistinct tympanum; head wider than long and moderate webbing in hind feet. Dorsal coloration varies from brown to ivory; brownish mottling on flanks, ventral coloration ivory with brown blotches reducing towards vent and inner and outer surface of thigh, inner surface of shank and inner surface of tarsus with a distinct dark brown
horizontal band which extends up to first three toes on upper surface.

Sexual dimorphism
Males lack nuptial pads. They possess a median subgular vocal sac with a pair of openings at the base of the lower jaw. The iris is dark brown. Females are larger than the male and possess a large ovary with creamy white eggs. Females have on their head a tetragonal cap like patch varying in color from pale pink to grey, iris colour reddish to golden brown (see the image: a = male;b = female).

Distribution
This species was described from bushes near Kakachi in the Agastyamalai region in the southern Western Ghats. It has not been reported from elsewhere.

Ecology and natural history notes
Individuals of this species are known to live in forest canopies. Vocalization usually begins early in the evening.

References

External links 

 AmphibiaWeb
 

kakachi
Endemic fauna of the Western Ghats
Frogs of India
Amphibians described in 2012